Ivan "Ivo" Granec (8 September 1895 – 9 January 1923) was a Croatian footballer.

International career
Granec represented Yugoslavia at the 1920 Summer Olympics which were held in Antwerp, in their first round match they were up against Czechoslovakia but they lost 0–7. It remained his sole international appearance.

Death
Granec committed suicide when aged just 27 years old.

References

External links
 

1895 births
1923 deaths
Footballers from Zagreb
Association football midfielders
Yugoslav footballers
Yugoslavia international footballers
Footballers at the 1920 Summer Olympics
Olympic footballers of Yugoslavia
HŠK Građanski Zagreb players
Yugoslav First League players
1923 suicides